The Dry River is a river in St Mary, Jamaica.

Course
The head of the river is a network of about 10 unnamed streams which rise on either side of the border between the parishes of St Mary and Portland in a district called Cocoa Wood. From here the river flows essentially northwards until it reaches the Caribbean Sea just west of the Golden Grove Estate. Along the way it passes a number of small settlements and named regions including (working downstream from south to north):

Perrys Tavern Gap
Warminister (sic)
Mount Joseph
Evandale
Happy Hut
Two Paths
Timsberry
Enfield
Juno Pen Village
Fort Stewart

Gradient
For this part of its course it has the character of a swift moving mountain river with numerous small waterfalls and rapids.

Infrastructure
Working downstream from south to north, the first bridge is at Timsberry where the river crosses from east to west under an unclassified road. The second is a little south of Enfield where it crosses back. The final two bridges come just before the river enters the sea; here it crosses from south to north first under a road bridge carrying the A4 from Kingston to Annotto Bay and then under a railway bridge carrying the now defunct Kingston to Port Antonio railway line.

The 1966 Directorate of Overseas Surveys 1:50,000 map shows the final two bridges as a single, combined road and rail bridge. There were a number of these along this coast, many built when the railway was first constructed in the mid-1890s, so it is quite possible that it was replaced at some point after 1966 but prior to the railways closure in 1978.

Tributaries
Most of the tributaries of the Dry River are short and appear to be unnamed. Working upstream from north to south (and taking the highest reaching tributary to be the true source) there are:
Four unnamed on the west or right bank.
Three unnamed on the east or left bank.
The May River on the west or right bank, which joins immediately below the Timsberry road bridge.
Two unnamed on the east or left bank.
Three unnamed on the west or right bank.
One unnamed on the east or left bank.
One unnamed on the west or right bank.

Dry River elsewhere in Jamaica
There are several other uses of the name Dry River in Jamaica, all being minor tributaries. They are located in the parishes of Clarendon, St Andrew and St Thomas.

See also
List of rivers of Jamaica

References
General
Ford, Jos C. and Finlay, A.A.C. (1908).The Handbook of Jamaica. Jamaica Government Printing Office

Inline

External links
Aerial view of the mouth of the Dry River
Aerial view of the road and rail bridges just south of the mouth
Aerial view of Enfield bridge
Aerial view of Timsberry bridge
Aerial view of the approximate site of the source of the Dry River

Rivers of Jamaica